
W.H. Morgan House was listed on the National Register of Historic Places (NRHP) in 1996.  It is located in the Downtown Historic District of Peabody, Kansas.

It was built in about 1881.  It is a two-story Italianate-style house with clapboard siding on a limestone block
foundation, with a hipped roof.

Gallery

See also
 List of museums in Kansas
 National Register of Historic Places listings in Marion County, Kansas
 Peabody Downtown Historic District
 Peabody Historical Library Museum

References

Further reading

External links

W.H. Morgan House
 Peabody Kansas Attractions - includes the Morgan House
 
 
Peabody Downtown Historic District (house is located in this district)
 
 
Maps
 Peabody City Map, KDOT
 Satellite view of House, Google Maps

Historic house museums in Kansas
Houses completed in 1881
Houses on the National Register of Historic Places in Kansas
Museums in Marion County, Kansas
Historic district contributing properties in Kansas
Houses in Marion County, Kansas
National Register of Historic Places in Marion County, Kansas
1881 establishments in Kansas